The Metropolitan Police Act 1856 (19 Vict c 2) is an Act of the Parliament of the United Kingdom, passed on 28 February 1856. The Act modified the previous two Metropolitan Police Acts of 1829 and 1839, merging the two roles of First Commissioner and Second Commissioner into the single role of Commissioner of Police of the Metropolis and setting up a system of two assistant commissioners under him. The roles of First and Second Joint Commissioner had been filled by Richard Mayne and William Hay until the latter's death in 1855. The Act provided for one of the First and Second Commissioners to become the sole Commissioner as soon as the other one died – effectively it meant that no new Second Joint Commissioner was appointed and Mayne became sole Commissioner. The Act also set the maximum for the Commissioner's annual salary at £1500 and that for each Assistant Commissioner at £800.

The Act also established the Assistant Commissioners as ex officio justices of the peace for all counties then partly or wholly covered by the Metropolitan Police District (i.e. Middlesex, Surrey, Hertfordshire, Essex, Kent, Berkshire and Buckinghamshire). He was not to act as a JP, however, "at any Court of General or Quarter Sessions, or in any Matter out of Sessions, except for the Preservation of the Peace, the Prevention of Crimes, the Detention and Committal of Offenders, and in carrying into execution the Purposes of this Act and the said recited Acts" and like usual JPs could not be elected as a Member of Parliament or vote in some general elections. In the case of the Commissioner of Police of the Metropolis being ill or the post being left vacant, either assistant commissioner could be authorised by one of the Principal Secretaries of State to act as acting commissioner. The assistant commissioners were also to be "within the Provisions of the Act of the Session holden in the Fourth and Fifth Years of King William the Fourth, Chapter Twenty-four, in like Manner as if their Offices were enumerated in the Schedule to that Act".

Sources

United Kingdom Acts of Parliament 1856
Police legislation in the United Kingdom